Rubén Darío Amorín Mattos (6 November 1927 – 24 December 2014) was a Uruguayan football player and coach. He was born in Rocha.

Playing career
Amorín arrived in 1952 in Guatemala to play for Guatemala FC.

Coaching career
He has spent the majority of his coaching career in Guatemala, where he won a record eight national titles with three clubs from 1964 to 1992, He took Municipal and Comunicaciones to win the CONCACAF Champions Cup in 1974 and 1978.

He also had five tenures as coach of the Guatemala national team, winning the 1967 NORCECA Championship (now the CONCACAF Gold Cup) which is the highest international honor for that national team to date. He retired in 1994.

Due to his success at both the club and international level, Amorín has been catalogued as the greatest coach in the history of Guatemalan football by the local press and by many observers. On 24 December 2014, he died of Alzheimer's disease at the age of 87.

References

1927 births
Footballers from Montevideo
Uruguayan footballers
Uruguayan expatriate sportspeople in Guatemala
Expatriate footballers in Guatemala
Uruguayan football managers
Expatriate football managers in Guatemala
C.S.D. Municipal managers
Comunicaciones F.C. managers
C.D. FAS managers
2014 deaths
Deaths from dementia in Guatemala
Deaths from Alzheimer's disease
Aurora F.C. managers

Association football midfielders
Guatemala national football team managers